The Grayzone is a far-left news website and blog founded and edited by American journalist Max Blumenthal. The website, initially founded as The Grayzone Project, was affiliated with AlterNet before becoming independent in early 2018. A fringe website, It is known for misleading reporting and sympathetic coverage of authoritarian regimes. The Grayzone has denied human rights abuses against Uyghurs, promulgated conspiracy theories about Venezuela, Xinjiang, Syria and other regions, and promoted pro-Russian propaganda during the Russian invasion of Ukraine. The Grayzone has been described by Commentary as a propaganda shop devoted to pushing pro-Assad, pro-Maduro, pro-Putin, and pro-Hamas narratives.

History 
The Grayzone was founded as a blog called The Grayzone Project in December 2015 by Max Blumenthal. The blog was hosted on AlterNet from its inception until early 2018, when The Grayzone became independent of the website.

Content 
The Grayzone's news content is generally considered to be fringe and the website maintains a pro-Kremlin editorial line.

The website has supported the government of Bashar al-Assad in Syria, publishing content denying that the Syrian government used chemical weapons against civilians during the Syrian civil war, and accused OPCW investigators of a "cover-up." The website has also denied the scope of the Xinjiang internment camps and alleged Uyghur genocide, downplaying widely reported abuses by the Chinese government against Turkic Muslim minorities in Xinjiang. A report from the Institute for Strategic Dialogue (ISD), which studied 28 social media accounts, individuals, outlets and organisations, stated that Grayzone reporter Aaron Maté was the "most prolific spreader of disinformation" on matters concerning Syria amongst its study group, overtaking Vanessa Beeley.

The Grayzone promoted the Nicaraguan government's narrative on the 2021 Nicaraguan general election and the 2018–2022 Nicaraguan protests. The platform also conducted an "unquestioning interview", according to The Guardian, with Daniel Ortega. Blumenthal and Norton expressed their support to the regime dancing to "El Comandante se queda" a cumbia song composed in support of Ortega during the 2018 protests. The Grayzone published an open letter, promoted by RT, criticizing The Guardian's coverage of Nicaragua and one of its contributors, Carl David Goette-Luciak. Goette-Luciak was later arrested and deported by the Nicaraguan government. John Perry, writing under the pseudonym Charles Redvers, published a "confession" on The Grayzone of student protester Valeska Sandoval. The confession was false and Sandoval made it under duress while in prison.

In February 2021, tweets concerning a Grayzone article by Blumenthal were the first to receive a Twitter warning label stating "These materials may have been obtained through hacking". The story was titled "Reuters, BBC, and Bellingcat participated in covert UK Foreign Office–funded programs to 'weaken Russia', leaked docs reveal". The story referred to hacked and leaked documents and alleged that a British Army unit has used "social media to help fight wars".

The website consistently published pro-Russian propaganda during the Russian invasion of Ukraine, including the debunked claim that Ukrainian fighters were using civilians as human shields, and that the Mariupol theatre bombing was staged by the Azov Regiment to warrant NATO intervention. The Russian fake news website Peace Data republished articles by The Grayzone in order to build a reputation as a progressive and anti-Western media source and to attract contributors. False claims published by The Grayzone are referenced by many Twitter users who back Assad and the Russian government.

After the documentary Navalny won an Academy Award, Grayzone published an article by Lucy Komisar critisizing the film, which was shown to be written by the neural network Writesonic and to refer to sources which did not exist.

Reception 
The Grayzone has been criticized for defending authoritarian regimes. Bruce Bawer, writing in Commentary, described The Grayzone as "a one-stop propaganda shop, devoted largely to pushing a pro-Assad line on Syria, a pro-regime line on Venezuela, a pro-Putin line on Russia, and a pro-Hamas line on Israel and Palestine". Nerma Jelacic, writing in the Index on Censorship, described The Grayzone as "a Kremlin-connected online outlet that pushes pro-Russian conspiracy theories and genocide denial." The Grayzone had previously claimed Jelacic's employer collaborated with ISIS and Jabhat al-Nusra affiliates.

Writing in socialist magazine New Politics, Lebanese Marxist academic Gilbert Achcar described The Grayzone as "pro-Putin, pro-Assad 'left-wing' propaganda combined with gutter journalism", stating that the website has "the habit of demonizing all left-wing critics of Putin and the likes of Assad by describing them as 'agents of imperialism' or some equivalent".

It has also been sharply criticized for its characterizations of the Xinjiang internment camps and other Chinese state abuses against Uyghurs. James Bloodworth, writing in the New Statesman, commented: "[i]n an echo of the way dictatorships publish the flattery of credulous foreign dupes in their state newspapers, Chinese Foreign Ministry spokespeople have approvingly tweeted articles from Blumenthal's online magazine The Grayzone which have sought to deny the persecution of China's Uighur population."

In February 2019, when a humanitarian aid convoy on the border of Venezuela caught fire, The Grayzone published an article by Blumenthal in which he argued that the U.S. government and mainstream media had falsely reported pro-Maduro forces as the individuals responsible for sparking the flames, writing that "the claim was absurd on its face." Glenn Greenwald, writing in The Intercept, commented that the story "compiled substantial evidence strongly suggesting that the trucks were set ablaze by anti-Maduro protesters".

In March 2020, the English Wikipedia formally deprecated the use of The Grayzone as a source for facts in its articles, citing issues with the website's factual reliability.

The Grayzone's invitation to the 2022 Web Summit, the largest technology conference in Europe, was withdrawn over backlash against the website's anti-Ukrainian narratives amid the Russian invasion of Ukraine.

Chinese state-affiliated entities 
The government of China, officials within the Chinese Communist Party (CCP), and Chinese state media have viewed The Grayzone's coverage of China positively. The site has been used as a vector to push Chinese Communist Party narratives on Xinjiang, Hong Kong, and Taiwan.

In order to dispute accusations of ongoing atrocities in Xinjiang, Chinese state media and Chinese officials have increasingly cited posts from The Grayzone in their public communications. According to a report from the Australian Strategic Policy Institute, Chinese state-controlled media and affiliated entities began to amplify articles from The Grayzone in December 2019 after the website posted an article critical of Xinjiang researcher Adrian Zenz. Chinese state-controlled media cited The Grayzone at least 313 times between December 2019 and February 2021, 252 of which were in English-language publications, the report said.

Contributors 
Former or current contributors to The Grayzone include Ben Norton, who served as assistant editor of the platform before departing from it in February 2022, Aaron Maté, Anya Parampil and Alex Rubinstein, the latter two being known for their work for the Russian state-owned television station RT.

See also 
 List of fake news websites
 MintPress News

References

External links 
 

American news websites
Internet properties established in 2015
American political websites
Far-left politics in the United States
Uyghur genocide denial
American conspiracy theorists
Conspiracist media
Disinformation operations
Fake news websites
Russian propaganda organizations
Chinese propaganda organisations
Alternative journalism organizations